Colin Stirling Ryrie (23 December 1929 – 7 July 1972) was an Australian Olympic sailor. He competed in the Finn class at the 1956 and 1964 Summer Olympic games.

In 1954 he and Jules Feldman formed Modern Magazines Pty Ltd and launched Modern Motor. Other titles followed in 1965, including Modern Boating, Hi-Fi Review, Rugby League Week and Electronics Today. A son, Kim Ryrie, co-designed the Fairlight CMI.

He was later commodore of the Royal Prince Edward Yacht Club in Sydney. He died in July 1972 after a boating accident late at night in Sydney Harbour.

References

External links
Olympic profile
Australian Olympians profile
Colin Ryrie's profile at Sports Reference.com

1929 births
1972 deaths
Australian male sailors (sport)
Olympic sailors of Australia
Sailors at the 1956 Summer Olympics – Finn
Sailors at the 1964 Summer Olympics – Finn
Boating accident deaths
20th-century Australian people